Wakley is the surname of the following people
Ralph Wakley (born 1941), American biathlete
Thomas Wakley (1795–1862), English surgeon and founding editor of The Lancet
James G. Wakley (1825–1886), the son of Thomas Wakley and the joint editor of The Lancet
Thomas Henry Wakley (1821–1907), the son of Thomas Wakley and the joint editor of The Lancet

See also
Stuart Wakley Fleetwood (born in 1986), English footballer
Cooper v Wakley, English tort law case